The Fulani War of 1804–1808, also known as the Fulani Jihad or Jihad of Usman dan Fodio, was a military conflict in present-day Nigeria and Cameroon.  The war began when Usman Dan Fodiyo, a prominent Islamic scholar and teacher, was exiled from Gobir by King Yunfa, one of his former students.

Usman Dan Fodiyo assembled an Islamic army to lead a jihad against the Hausa Kingdoms of north Nigeria.  The forces of Usman Danfodiyo slowly took over more and more of the Hausa kingdoms, capturing Gobir in 1808 and executing Yunfa.  The war resulted in the creation of the Sokoto Caliphate, headed by Usman Danfodiyo, which became one of the largest states in Africa in the 19th century. His success inspired similar jihads in Western Africa.

Background
The Kanem-Bornu Empire had been powerful in the area from the mid-18th century. The result was the decline of a number of independent Hausa kingdoms throughout the region, which had been defeated by Sheikh Al'amin El-kanemi. Two prominent Hausa kingdoms were Gobir and Zamfara. Also Kanem-Bornu empire largely defeated and captured Usman dan fodio and imprisoned him. However, warfare between the Hausa states and with other states were constant for the latter 18th century, resulting in a harsh system of conscription and taxation, dan Fodio was later released by Sheikh Al'amin Elkanemi.   The Fulani, a largely pastoral people, were often the victims of Hausa taxation, land control and other feudal practices.

Lead up to war
Usman dan Fodio, born in 1754, joined a growing number of traveling Islamic scholars through the Hausa kingdoms in the 1770s and became quite popular in the 1790s.  Originally, dan Fodio's preaching received the support of the leadership of Gobir; however, as his influence increased and as he began to advocate for self-defense arming by his followers, his favor with the leadership decreased.  Sarkin Gobir Nafata, the king of Gobir, placed a series of restrictions on dan Fodio's preaching.  In 1801, Sarkin Gobir Yunfa, a former pupil of dan Fodio, replaced Nafata as king of Gobir.  However, Yunfa increased the restrictions on dan Fodio and exiled him from Gobir to the village of Degel.  A crisis developed later in 1803 when Yunfa attacked and captured many of the followers of a group associated with dan Fodio.  Yunfa then marched the prisoners through Degel, enraging many of dan Fodio's followers, who attacked the army and freed the prisoners.  Yunfa gave dan Fodio the option of exile before destroying Degel, which led to the large-scale hijra of dan Fodio's community to Gudu.  So many people went with dan Fodio throughout the state that on February 21, 1804, Yunfa declared war on dan Fodio and threatened punishment to anyone joining him.  Followers of dan Fodio declared him to be the Amir al-Mu'minin, commander of the faithful, and denounced their allegiance to Gobir.

Battles
Several minor skirmishes preceded the forces meeting at the Battle of Tsuntua.  Although Yunfa was victorious and dan Fodio lost a number of men, the battle did not diminish his force. He retaliated by capturing the village of Matankari, which resulted in the battle of Tafkin Kwattoa, a major action between Yunfa and dan Fodio's forces. Although outnumbered, dan Fodio's troops were able to prevent Yunfa from advancing on Gunu and thus convince larger numbers of people to join his forces.

In 1805, the forces of dan Fodio, the jihadists, captured the Hausa kingdom of Kebbi.  In 1807 the jihadists had taken over Katsina whose ruler, Magajin Halidu, committed suicide following the defeat. They then captured the Sultanate of Kano whose king (Muhammad Alwali II) was forced to flee to Zazzau, then the village of Burum-Burum where he was soon killed in battle.  In 1808, the jihadists assaulted Gobir, killing Yunfa in the battle of Alkalawa, and destroying large parts of the city. Furthermore Abdullahi dan Fodio also took over the Kebbi Emirate the same year.

With the capture of Gobir, the jihadists saw that they were part of a wider regional struggle. They continued with battles against a number of Hausa kingdoms, and the Sokoto Caliphate expanded over the next two years.  The last major expansion of the jihadists was the toppling of the Sayfawa dynasty in 1846.

Founding of the Sokoto Caliphate
Muhammed Bello, the son of Usman dan Fodio, transformed the semi-permanent camp of Sokoto into a city in 1809, during the Fulani war.  Dan Fodio ruled from Sokoto as the religious leader of the Fulani jihad states from that point until 1815, when he retired from administrative duties.  The Caliphate appointed various Emirs to govern the various states of the empire.  These men were often veterans of the Fulani wars.

Legacy
The success of the jihad inspired a number of later West African jihadists, including Massina Empire founder Seku Amadu, Toucouleur Empire founder Umar Tall, Wassoulou Empire founder Samori Ture, Adamawa Emirate founder Modibo Adama and Zabarma Emirate founder Babatu (warlord).

The Sokoto Caliphate has continued to the present. Since the British conquest of the Caliphate in 1903, and later Nigerian independence under a constitutional government in 1960, the Caliphate's political authority has diminished. But the position still has considerable spiritual authority.

See also
Fulani jihads
History of Nigeria

References

1800s conflicts
Sokoto Caliphate
Wars involving the states and peoples of Africa
Wars involving Cameroon
Wars involving Nigeria
19th century in Africa
1800s in Nigeria